WXES (1110 AM) is a Class D radio station broadcasting on a clear-channel frequency in Chicago, Illinois. It is owned and operated by El Sembrador Ministries, owner of the ESNE Radio Spanish-language Catholic network, and it broadcasts from transmitter facilities and tower located in Addison, Illinois.

Historically WMBI for 95 years, its founder, the Moody Bible Institute, sold the AM facility in 2021. The station broadcasts during daytime hours only, to protect clear channel stations KFAB in Omaha, Nebraska and WBT in Charlotte, North Carolina. Hours of operation are determined by the Federal Communications Commission (FCC); daytime broadcasting varies monthly with the changes in sunrise and sunset.

History
WMBI was established in 1926 by the Moody Bible Institute. The station originally broadcast at 1080 kHz, sharing time with WCBD. WMBI's frequency was changed to 1110 kHz in March 1941, as a result of the North American Regional Broadcasting Agreement.

WMBI switched from a primarily English-language Christian format to a Spanish-language Christian format on February 6, 2012, making it the first full-time format of its kind on analog radio in Chicago. In 2019, Moody announced it intended to sell the station.

In 2021, El Sembrador Ministries acquired WMBI and a permit for an owned FM translator, W292GB (106.3 FM), from Moody for $1.6 million. ESNE Radio already aired part-time on WNDZ in Portage, Indiana. The transaction was consummated on July 13, 2021, and on July 19,  the station's call sign was changed to WXES.

References

External links

XES
XES
XES
Radio stations established in 1926
1926 establishments in Illinois
XES